Kiryanova is a rural locality (a village) in Cherdynsky District, Perm Krai, Russia. The population was 18 as of 2010. There are 3 streets.

Geography 
Kiryanova is located 99 km southwest of Cherdyn (the district's administrative centre) by road. Bayandina is the nearest rural locality.

References 

Rural localities in Cherdynsky District